Apostolos Pitsos (29 June 1918 – 1 January 2023) was a Greek industrialist and businessman.

Early years
Pitsos was born in Ampelokipoi, Athens, on 29 June 1918. He grew up there and studied at the German School of Athens where in the third grade his classmate was future Prime Minister Georgios Rallis. From a young age, he worked in the family business Pitsos. After school, in 1937, he went to Aue, Germany, where he studied mechanical engineering. At the beginning of the Greco-Italian War, he returned to Greece and went to the anti-aircraft artillery based in Menidi.

Career
After the end of the war, having knowledge in engineering, Pitsos upgraded his family's small handicraft to the well-known electrical company Pitsos. He implemented the idea of constructing modern factory facilities in Renti. In 1977, it started working with Siemens. The Bosch-Siemens Hausgeräte GmbH group acquired 60% of the Greek company while Siemens S.A. Hellas acquired 20%. The arrival of investors put the company on an upward trajectory. In 1989, the production of No Frost refrigerators started and in 1994, it started exporting kitchens to Scandinavia. In 1996, the company was renamed BSP S.A. and later BSH Home Appliances S.A. in 2002.

Later life and death
Pistos lived in Psychiko, and turned 100 in 2018. He received two doses of the COVID-19 vaccine in 2021.

Pitsos died on 1 January 2023, at the age of 104.

References

1918 births
2023 deaths
20th-century Greek businesspeople
21st-century Greek businesspeople
Businesspeople from Athens
Greek centenarians
Men centenarians